Lili Heglund (5 September 1904 – 3 October 1992) was a Danish film actress. She appeared in 24 films between 1938 and 1973. She was born in Copenhagen, Denmark and died in Denmark.

Selected filmography

Balletten danser - 1938
Mordets melodi - 1944
Den gamle mølle på Mols - 1953
Hendes store aften - 1954
Det var på Rundetårn - 1955
Bruden fra Dragstrup - 1955
Krudt og klunker - 1958
Baronessen fra benzintanken - 1960
Gøngehøvdingen - 1961
Komtessen - 1961
Drømmen om det hvide slot - 1962
Frk. Nitouche - 1963
Don Olsen kommer til byen - 1964
Hold da helt ferie - 1965
Nu stiger den - 1966
Brødrene på Uglegården - 1967
Hurra for de blå husarer - 1970
Et døgn med Ilse - 1971

External links

1904 births
1992 deaths
Danish film actresses
Actresses from Copenhagen
20th-century Danish actresses